Jackson Nickerson (born 1962) is an American academic who studies leadership, organizations, and strategy. Nickerson was the Frahm Family Professor of Organization and Strategy (Emeritus) in Olin Business School at Washington University in St. Louis.  He also was the Associate Dean and Director of Brookings Executive Education from 2009-2017 and was a non-resident Senior Fellow in Governance Studies at the Brookings Institution from 2010-2020.

Biography
Nickerson grew up in Weymouth, Massachusetts, attended Worcester Polytechnic Institute where he  received a Bachelor of Science in Mechanical Engineering, followed by a Masters in Mechanical Engineering at  University of California, Berkeley. He worked for NASA’s Jet Propulsion Laboratory, before returning to Berkeley  for a Master in Business Administration from the Haas School of Business.  He later returned to  Haas for  a Ph.D., simultaneously working for six years as a consultant for the Law and Economics Consulting Group.

Nickerson was appointed Assistant Professor at Olin Business School in 1996,  promoted to associate professor (2001),  full professor (2005), the Frahm Family Professor of Organization and Strategy (2007), and received emeritus status in 2020. After becoming strategy group chair in 2008, he was appointed Director of Brookings Executive Education in 2009 and became its Associate Sean in 2010.  In 2009 he became a non-resident Senior Fellow in Governance Studies at the Brookings Institution and was the first Senior Visiting Fellow at the Grameen Foundation in 2010 and 2011. From 2013 through 2014 he wrote the leadership columns “Ask EIG: Leadership insights for Federal managers” for Government Executive Online and has been a speaker for the Institute of Management Studies since 2014.
  In 2019, Nickerson received the Strategic Management Society's Education Impact Award.

Research Areas
Nickerson’s early research built upon Oliver Williamson’s transaction cost economics to predict the antecedents and performance consequences of organizational choices in a wide variety of empirical settings and industries.  Along with Todd Zenger, he introduced the concepts of organizational vacillation and envy as foundations to firm boundaries, and is credited with introducing the Problem Finding and Problem Solving Perspective, which provides a knowledge-based foundation for a theory of firm boundaries, organizational choice, entrepreneurship, and the design of group processes to overcome biases.

Entrepreneurship
In 1995, Nickerson co-founded the  Intellectual Capital Management Group.  In 2006, he co-founded NFORMD.NET, a new media company that through its subsidiary   StudentSuccess.org  provides sexual assault prevention training at over 350 colleges and universities and to the US Army. Between 2009 and 2012, he was a board member of Clean Tech Bio-fuels.  He also is a co-founder of Acquilang LLC and EPC Learning Labs LLC.

Curriculum innovations
Nickerson is a co-creator of Critical Thinking@Olin, an approach to teaching critical thinking that won the inaugural MBA Roundtable Innovator Award].  The approach is taught to other business schools a part of AACSB’s Curriculum Development Series. In conjunction with AACSB, he developed Leading in the Academic Enterprise, an approach for developing leaders in academia. Through Brookings Executive Education he developed and launched  Leading Thinking an approach to leadership in which inquiry and critical thinking are the core. In 2019, Nickerson received the Strategic Management Society's Educational Impact Award, and in a video describes the differences between pedagogy, andragogy, and mbagogy.

Books
 Leading in Government: Practical advice to leadership questions from the front lines'''. J.A. Nickerson, Brookings Executive Education, 2016. 
 Leading Change from the Middle: A Practical Guide to Building Extraordinary Capabilities'. J.A. Nickerson, Brookings Press, 2014. 
 Tackling Wicked Government Problems: A Practical Guide for Enterprise Leaders . J.A. Nickerson and R. Sanders (eds.), Brookings Press, 2013.

  Economic Institutions of Strategy.'' J. A. Nickerson and B. S. Silverman (eds.), Advances in Strategic Management (Vol. 26), Emerald Group Publishing Limited, 2009.

References

External links
 Nickerson Faculty Page at Olin Business School.
 WUSTL media
 Jackson Nickerson at Government Executive.
 Jackson Nickerson at IMS

1962 births
Living people
Washington University in St. Louis faculty
American business theorists
University of California, Berkeley alumni
Worcester Polytechnic Institute alumni
21st-century American economists